Quintiq is a Dutch company that develops planning, scheduling and supply chain optimization software.  The company is headquartered in 's-Hertogenbosch and its North American headquarters are in Radnor, Pennsylvania. As of October 2014, the company is known as DELMIA Quintiq.

History
The company was founded in 's-Hertogenbosch (Den Bosch) in September 1997 by former Bolesian employees including Dr. Victor Allis. Allis and several colleagues initially began developing a scheduling application for an aluminum manufacturer as a side project. It was offered first to Allis's then-employer, but Bolesian was not interested. Because the software they developed was highly configurable, and thus of use to many other types of companies, it was decided that a new firm should be created around the software. Preparing the software for sale to as wide a variety as possible of corporate customers took two years of development.

Quintiq sold its software to a client for the first time in 1999.

In 2011, two investment firms, LLR Partners Inc. and NewSpring Capital Ventures LP, bought into Quintiq, giving them a 48% stake in the company's ownership.

Later in 2014, Quintiq was bought by Dassault Systèmes.

Products
Quintiq's Supply Chain Planning software has three layers or modules: one based on service-oriented architecture, with both optimization and planning management features; one that provides a variety of different templates for use in different industries; and one customized for each Quintiq customer. Quintiq's uses AI pattern recognition to help customers manage their supply chain logistics. Other features of the software include adaptive capacity planning, automated real-time scheduling, a multi-function company planner, a multi-scenario macro planner, materials management tools, and proprietary algorithms for coordinating production with customer orders. Competitor software is more robust in a number of specific areas, and for this reason some Quintiq users employ both Quintiq software and competitors' products in a hybrid approach to supply chain management.

Locations
In addition to its world headquarters in Den Bosch and its North American headquarters in Radnor, Quintiq has offices in Melbourne, Australia; Shanghai, China; Vantaa, Finland; Mannheim, Germany; Rome, Italy; Petaling Jaya, Malaysia; and London, United Kingdom.

Clients
Notable companies and organizations which use Quintiq software include Copenhagen Airport, Danone, international shipping company DHL, the United States Federal Aviation Administration (FAA), Jumbo (supermarket),  KLM Royal Dutch Airlines, freight forwarder P&O Ferrymasters, and retailer Walmart.

Acquisition 
On July 24, 2014, Dassault Systèmes announced plans to acquire Quintiq for $336 million.  The deal was subject to regulatory approval in Germany and Austria. By October 2014, the sale was complete.

References

Software companies of the Netherlands
Supply chain software companies